Gionata Verzura (born 27 May 1992) is a Thai-Italian professional footballer who plays as a defensive midfielder or a right back  for Thai League 1 club Chiangrai United.

Personal life
Gionata was born in Bangkok. His father is Italian and his mother is Thai. Gionata's twin older brother Antonio is also a footballer and plays as a right back.

Honours

Club
Chiangrai United
 Thai FA Cup (1): 2020–21
 Thailand Champions Cup (1): 2020

References

External links
 

1992 births
Living people
Gionata Verzura
Gionata Verzura
Gionata Verzura
Association football midfielders
Gionata Verzura
Gionata Verzura
Gionata Verzura
Gionata Verzura
Gionata Verzura
Twin sportspeople
Gionata Verzura